The Albanian Geological Survey is an advisory institution of the Albanian Government which carries out its activities in the field of land sciences throughout the territory of Albania.

This institution dates back to 1922, when a geological office was established at the Ministry of Agriculture and Public Works under the direction of head geologist Dr. Ernest Nowack. After seven years of activity, the office was no longer documented in official records. Its activities resumed in 1952 when the Albanian Geological Survey was formed.

Structure 
SHGJSH is organized into the following departments:

 Department of Geology
 Department of Hydrogeology
 Department of Data-processing and Publications
 Department of Support Services
 Department of Coordination and Development
 Department of Geoengineering, Geophysics and Geodesy
 Department of Laboratories and Chemical Analysis
 Department of Mineral Resources.

Directors

References

Survey
Government agencies established in 1922
 
National geological agencies
Geological surveys